Counsell is a surname. Notable people with the surname include:

 Craig Counsell (born 1970), American baseball player
 D'Arcy Argue Counsell Martin (1898–1992), Ontario lawyer and political figure
 Duaine Counsell (1920–2012), American football and baseball coach
 Elizabeth Counsell (born 1942), English actress
 Eos Counsell (born 1976), Welsh violinist 
 Frank Counsell (1864–1933), Australian architect
 Garth Counsell, South African Anglican archbishop
 Harry Counsell (1909–1990), English footballer 
 John Counsell (pastor) (born 1959), Canadian broadcaster and pastor
 John Counsell (theatre director) (1905–1987), English actor, director and theatre manager
 Marilyn Trenholme Counsell (born 1933), Canadian Senator
 Melanie Counsell (born 1964), Welsh filmmaker, installation artist and sculptor

See also
 Late Night Counsell, radio talk show